Nicolet Public School is located in Kaukauna, Wisconsin. Formerly, it served as an elementary school, but currently serves as office and educational space for non-profit organizations. It was added to the National Register of Historic Places in 1984 for its architectural significance.

References

School buildings on the National Register of Historic Places in Wisconsin
Schools in Outagamie County, Wisconsin
Romanesque architecture
Romanesque Revival architecture in Wisconsin
School buildings completed in 1901
Public elementary schools in Wisconsin
National Register of Historic Places in Outagamie County, Wisconsin
1901 establishments in Wisconsin